St. Margarets is a settlement in Northumberland County, New Brunswick near the intersection of Route 11 and Route 440.

History

Notable people

See also
List of communities in New Brunswick

References

Communities in Northumberland County, New Brunswick
Designated places in New Brunswick
Local service districts of Northumberland County, New Brunswick